Mauro Malavasi (born 21 March 1957) is an Italian pianist, songwriter and producer. He was an important figure in Italian disco with his business partner Jacques Fred Petrus and went on to write and produce hits with various Italian musicians. He received a Pico Mirandola Award in his hometown in 2008. He created the R&B band Change, in the process discovering vocalists Luther Vandross and Jocelyn Brown, and had a million-selling single, "A Lover's Holiday". Later in his career he became co-writer and producer of Italian superstar singer Lucio Dalla.

References

Living people
Italian dance musicians
Italian record producers
1957 births
People from Mirandola